The following is a list of episodes from the series Tom and Jerry Tales.

Series overview

Episodes

Season 1 (2006–07)

Season 2 (2007–08)

References 

Lists of American children's animated television series episodes
Lists of Canadian children's animated television series episodes